Pierre de Chappes (died 24 March 1336) was a 14th-century Bishop of Arras, Cardinal and Chancellor of France.

Biography 
De Chappes was born in Villemeux-sur-Eure, France. Pierre de Chappes was Canon of the chapter of Chartres, Reims and Amiens and Chancellor of France from  1317 to 1320 and Treasurer of the Diocese of Laon from 1317. 

In 1320, he was elected Bishop of Arras in the Roman Catholic Diocese of Arras and transferred to the Diocese of Chartres in 1326. 

Chappes was made a cardinal by Pope John XXII in the consistory of 18 December 1327. 

Cardinal de Chappes participated in the conclave of 1334, during which Benedict XII was elected.

He died 24 March 1336 in Avignon.

References 

Bishops of Arras
Bishops of Chartres
Roman Catholic monks
Year of birth unknown
People from Eure-et-Loir
1336 deaths